There are 290 species of sponges recorded in Ireland, although the true figure is thought to be close to 500; 134 species were recorded off Rathlin Island alone.

Sponges are animals of the phylum Porifera; sessile aquatic animals without true tissues.

Class Calcarea (calcareous sponges)

Order Clathrinida

Family Clathrinidae

Clathrina contorta (Ascandra contorta)
Clathrina coriacea (Ascandra coriacea)
Guancha lacunosa

Order Leucosolenida

Family Grantiidae
 
Grantia compressa (purse sponge)
Leucandra fistulosa
Leucandra gossei
Leuconia johnstoni 
Leuconia nivea

Family Leucosoleniidae

Leucosolenia botryoides
Leucosolenia complicata
Leucosolenia variabilis

Family Sycettidae

Sycon ciliatum
Sycon elegans

Class Demospongiae (horny sponges)

Order Agelasida

Family Hymerhabdiidae

Hymerhabdia typica

Order Astrophorida

Family Geodiidae

Pachymatisma johnstonia

Order Axinellida

Family Raspailiidae

Eurypon viride
Eurypon clavatum
Eurypon major
Hymeraphia breeni
Hymeraphia elongata 
Hymeraphia stellifera
Hymeraphia verticillata
Raspaciona aculeata 
Raspailia hispida
Raspailia ramosa

Family Stelligeridae

Halicnemia patera
Stelligera rigida 
Stelligera stuposa

Order Bubarida

Family Bubaridae

Bubaris vermiculata

Family Dictyonellidae

Dictyonella incisa
Spongionella pulchella
Tethyspira spinosa

Order Chondrillida

Family Halisarcidae

Halisarca dujardini

Order Chondrosida

Family Chondrillidae

Thymosia guernei

Order Dendroceratida (keratose/horny sponges)

Family Darwinellidae

Aplysilla rosea
Aplysilla sulfurea

Order Dictyoceratida (keratose/horny sponges)

Family Dysideidae

Dysidea fragilis
Dysidea pallescens

Order Hadromerida

Family Clionaidae

Cliona celata (red boring sponge)
Cliona lobata

Family Hemiasterellidae

Paratimea constellata

Family Polymastiidae

Polymastia agglutinans
Polymastia boletiformis (yellow tit-sponge)
Polymastia mamillaris
Polymastia penicillus
Polymastia spinula
Quasillina brevis
Sphaerotylus grey (B)
Sphaerotylus spa

Family Suberitidae

Terpios fugax
Laxosuberites
Protosuberites epiphytum 
Protosuberites incrustans
Pseudosuberites sulphureus
Suberites carnosus
Suberites ficus
Suberites pagurorum

Family Tethyidae

Tethya aurantium (golf ball sponge, orange puffball sponge)
Tethya citrina
Tethya hibernica
Tethya norvegica

Order Halichondrida

Family Axinellidae

Axinella damicornis
Axinella dissimilis
Axinella flustra
Axinella infundibuliformis
Axinella parva
Axinella pyramidata
Axinella rugosa
Phakellia ventilabrum (chalice sponge)

Family Halichondriidae

Halichondria bowerbanki (Bowerbank's halichondria)
Halichondria panicea (breadcrumb sponge)
Hymeniacidon kitchingi
Hymeniacidon perlevis (crumb-of-bread sponge)
Spongosorites calcicola

Order Haplosclerida

Family Chalinidae

Chalinula limbata
Haliclona cinerea
Haliclona fistulosa
Haliclona oculata (mermaid's glove)
Haliclona simulans
Haliclona urceolus
Haliclona viscosa

Order Poecilosclerida

Family Acarnidae

Iophon hyndmani
Iophon nigricans

Family Coelosphaeridae
Lissodendoryx jenjonesae

Family Crellidae

Crella plana
Crella rosea

Family Desmacellidae

Biemna variantia
Desmacella annexa

Family Esperiopsidae

Amphilectus fucorum
Amphilectus lobatus 
Esperiopsis
Ulosa stuposa

Family Hymedesmiidae

Hemimycale columella
Hymedesmia cohesibacilla
Hymedesmia coriacea
Hymedesmia crami
Hymedesmia cratera
Hymedesmia hibernica
Hymedesmia jecusculum
Hymedesmia pansa
Hymedesmia paupertas
Hymedesmia peachi
Hymedesmia primitiva
Hymedesmia rathlinia
Hymedesmia umbelliformis
Phorbas fictitius
Phorbas plumosus
Phorbas punctatus
Plocamiancora arndti
Plocamionida ambigua
Plocamionida tylotata
Spanioplon armaturum
Stylostichon

Family Microcionidae

Antho brattegardi
Antho coriacea
Antho granditoxa
Antho inconstans
Antho involvens
Clathria armata
Clathria atrasanguinea
Clathria barleei
Clathria elliptichela
Clathria fallax
Clathria laevis
Clathria spinarcus
Clathria strepsitoxa
Ophlitaspongia papilla

Family Mycalidae

Mycale contarenii
Mycale lingua
Mycale macilenta
Mycale minima
Mycale rotalis
Mycale subclavata

Family Myxillidae

Myxilla ancorata
Myxilla fimbriata
Myxilla incrustans
Myxilla rosacea

Order Spirophorida

Family Tetillidae

Craniella cranium
Craniella zetlandica

Order Tetractinellida

Family Ancorinidae

Dercitus bucklandi
Stryphnus ponderosus
Stelletta grubii

Order Verongiida

Family Ianthellidae

Hexadella racovitzai

Class Homoscleromorpha

Order Homosclerophorida

Family Oscarellidae

Oscarella lobularis
Oscarella rubra

Family Plakinidae

Plakortis simplex

References

Sponges
Ireland, List